Frederick Pyne (born 30 December 1936) is an English actor best known for his role as original character Matt Skilbeck on the ITV soap Emmerdale Farm from 1972 to 1989.

Biography
Pyne attended Holloway County Grammar School (now Holloway School). He worked as a farmer before serving in the Royal Air Force, and then went to RADA for training as an actor. From 1966 to 1970, he worked on stage productions at the National Theatre at the Old Vic.

His television appearances include Crossroads, Dixon of Dock Green, An Affair of Honour, The Three Princes, Talking to a Stranger, and R3 before his role on Emmerdale Farm from 1972 to 1989.

References

Frederick Pyne served on the Equity Council for many years and was the organization's president from 1994 until 2002. He is a trustee of five charities connected to the acting profession.

External links

1936 births
Living people
20th-century Royal Air Force personnel
Alumni of RADA
English male stage actors
English male television actors
People educated at Holloway School